Mautodontha parvidens is an extinct species of small air-breathing land snails, terrestrial pulmonate gastropod mollusks in the family Charopidae.

This species was endemic to French Polynesia. It is now extinct.

References

Mautodontha
Extinct gastropods
Gastropods described in 1884
Taxonomy articles created by Polbot